Qaiser Jamal (born 16 January 1982) is a Pakistani politician who had been a member of the National Assembly of Pakistan, from June 2013 to May 2018.

Early life
He was born on 16 January 1982.

Political career
He was elected to the National Assembly of Pakistan as a candidate of Pakistan Tehreek-e-Insaf from Constituency NA-47 (Tribal Area-XII) in 2013 Pakistani general election. He received 11,328 votes and defeated Mufti Abdul Shakoor, a candidate of Jamaat-e-Islami Pakistan.

In 2014, an election tribunal de-seated Jamal and ordered re-election in the constituency. The Supreme Court of Pakistan later reinstated the National Assembly membership of Jamal.

References

Living people
Pakistan Tehreek-e-Insaf politicians
Pashtun people
Pakistani MNAs 2013–2018
People from Khyber Pakhtunkhwa
1982 births